Solid is an album led by trumpeter Woody Shaw which was recorded in 1986 and released on the Muse label. Solid was reissued by Mosaic Records as part of Woody Shaw: The Complete Muse Sessions in 2013.

Reception

Scott Yanow of Allmusic stated, "This CD serves as a perfect introduction to the memorable but always underrated trumpeter Woody Shaw, who tragically had only three years left to live".

Track listing 
 "There Will Never Be Another You" (Mack Gordon, Harry Warren) - 6:59
 "You Stepped Out of a Dream" (Nacio Herb Brown, Gus Kahn) - 5:32
 "Speak Low" (Ogden Nash, Kurt Weill) - 8:58
 "Solid" (Sonny Rollins) - 4:41
 "It Might as Well Be Spring" (Oscar Hammerstein II, Richard Rodgers) - 10:06
 "The Woody Woodpecker Song" (Ramey Idriss, George Tibbles) - 3:46

Personnel 
Woody Shaw - trumpet
Kenny Garrett - alto saxophone
Kenny Barron - piano
Peter Leitch - guitar
Neil Swainson - bass
Victor Jones - drums

References 

Woody Shaw albums
1987 albums
Muse Records albums
Albums produced by Michael Cuscuna
Albums recorded at Van Gelder Studio